Duane Steele is a Canadian country music artist. He has released five studio albums and one greatest hits album, and has charted multiple singles on the Canadian country singles charts, including the Number One hit "Anita Got Married" in 1996. A new album entitled "Drive On" was released in 2019.

Biography
Duane Steele's career began when he became the lead singer of the band Rock 'N' Horse in 1984. The band released one album, Highways, in 1991, and the song "Real Good Love" reached No. 69 on the Canadian country singles chart. However, members of the band went their separate ways in 1993.

Steele moved to Nashville and signed a publishing contract with Warner-Chappell. He scored a record deal with Mercury Records in 1995 after a performance during Canadian Country Music Week. The following year, he released his debut solo album, P.O. Box 423. The first four singles from the project all reached the top 10 on the Canadian country chart, including "Anita Got Married," which became Steele's first No. 1 song. He was nominated for the Vista Rising Star Award by the Canadian Country Music Association (CCMA) in 1996, but lost to Terri Clark. He also received a nomination for Male Vocalist of the Year. In 1997, the Juno Awards nominated Steele for Best Country Male Vocalist, and also the all-genre Best New Solo Artist. He won his first award, Vocal Event of the Year, at the 1997 CCMA Awards for his duet with Lisa Brokop, "Two Names On An Overpass."

Steele's second album, This Is the Life, was released in September 1997. The disc included a cover of Gordon Lightfoot's "If You Could Read My Mind." The first two singles, "Tell The Girl" and "If I Could Just Get To You," both reached the Canadian top 10. Steele was again nominated for Male Vocalist of the Year in 1998 at both the CCMA Awards and the Juno Awards. When subsequent singles failed to reach the top 30, Steele and Mercury parted ways.

Steele moved back to Canada in 1999 and began writing for his third album. I'll Be Alright was released in August 2000 on Steele's own Jolt Records and distributed by Royalty Records. Seven singles were released from the project, including "The Good Side Of Your Goodbye," "This Is Love," "I-65" and "The Heart Of The It Don't Matter." In 2001, the CCMA named Steele Independent Male Artist of the Year.

Steele released a greatest hits album, Set List, in 2004. The album collected seventeen of Steele's biggest hits, along with three new songs. Steele's fourth studio album, Ghost Town, was released in 2006 on Icon Records. It was followed by Gas and Time, released in 2010 on Jolt. A new album entitled "Drive On" will be released in 2019.

Discography

Studio albums

Compilation albums

Singles

1990s

2000s and 2010s

Featured singles

Music videos

Awards
Canadian Country Music Awards
1997 – Vocal Collaboration of the Year ("Two Names On An Overpass" with Lisa Brokop)
2001 – Independent Male Artist of the Year

References

External links
Duane Steele

Living people
Canadian country singer-songwriters
Canadian male singer-songwriters
Year of birth missing (living people)